The Hydrurga Rocks are a group of rocks lying east of Two Hummock Island, in the Palmer Archipelago, Antarctica. They were photographed by the Falkland Islands and Dependencies Aerial Survey Expedition, 1955–57, and were named by the UK Antarctic Place-Names Committee in 1960 after Hydrurga leptonyx, the leopard seal.

References

Rock formations of the Palmer Archipelago